Avrig (Transylvanian Saxon: Freck/Fraek) is a town in Sibiu County, Transylvania, central Romania. It has a population of 12,815 and the first documents attesting its existence date to 1346. It officially became a town in 1989, as a result of the Romanian rural systematization program.

Demographics 

At the 2011 census, 95.6% of inhabitants were Romanians, 2.1% Hungarians, 1.5% Roma, and 0.5% Germans (Transylvanian Saxons).

Administration and local politics

Town council 

The town's current local council has the following multi-party political composition, based on the results of the votes cast at the 2020 Romanian local elections:

Geography 

The town administers four villages: Bradu (Gierelsau; Fenyőfalva), Glâmboaca (Hühnerbach; Glimboka), Mârșa and Săcădate (Sekadaten; Oltszakadát). It is situated in the historical region of Transylvania.

It is the main starting point for the trekking routes in the western part of the mountains, and also on access point at a great number of chalets in the mountains: Cabana Poiana Neamțului, Cabana Bârcaciu, Cabana Ghiocelul.

Economy 

Avrig SA Glass Factory, a company specialized in lime mouthblown glass, started its origins in Avrig in the 17th century.

Mârșa village is the site of the Mecanica Mârșa Works, which manufactures auto-trailers and military vehicles.

Tourism 

The most important objective in the town is the Brukenthal Summer Palace built in 1771, a baroque summer residence of baron Samuel von Brukenthal, the governor of Transylvania. Also two old churches can be found there: the evangelical church, built in the 13th century and fortified in the 16th century and the orthodox church, built in the 18th century.

Bradu village features a fortified church first attested in 1315, with the last major modification in 1804.

Natives 

 Gheorghe Lazăr, founder of the first Romanian-language school
 Vasile Stoica, diplomat

Image gallery

References

External links 

 Avrig Town Hall Official Site 
 Brukenthal Palace Avrig

Towns in Romania
Populated places in Sibiu County
Localities in Transylvania